Connor Cecil Williams (born 7 August 1973 in Gujarat) is an Indian first class cricketer, who played for Baroda. He is a left-handed opening batsman.

Career 
A left-handed opening batsman, Williams came to the selectors attention after the 2001 Irani Trophy where he scored 143 in the first innings and 83 in the second. He was rewarded with a place in the India squad for the 2001 tour of South Africa. Williams played in the test match at Centurion Park, but the match was made unofficial due to Indian protests over the suspension of Virender Sehwag.

References

External links
 

1973 births
Indian cricketers
Baroda cricketers
West Zone cricketers
Living people